Siah Cheshmeh (also Romanized as Sīāh Cheshmeh) is a village in Boluran Rural District, Darb-e Gonbad District, Kuhdasht County, Lorestan Province, Iran. At the 2006 census, its population was 488, in 111 families.

References 

Towns and villages in Kuhdasht County